The Midnight Drives is a 2007 British comedy-drama film written and directed by Mark Jenkin, which revolves around a divorcee who takes his bored children on a series of mystical, dream-like excursions through the Cornish country-side after initially failing to connect with them.

Cast
 Colin Holt as Andy Stafford
 Alex Reid as Sophie
 Mary Woodvine as Cafe Owner
 John Woodvine as Guesthouse owner
 Sam Mills as Casey Stafford
 Megan Robertson as Gabrielle Stafford

Production
The film was made by independent film company O-Region and had Pippa Best on board as producer. It was filmed at various locations around Cornwall including Land's End, Marazion and Penzance.

Release
The Midnight Drives premiered in the United Kingdom at the Cornwall Film Festival in October 2007 to a packed house and was subsequently selected for the London Film Focus and Ecran Britanniques festivals as well as the Celtic Media.

Critical reception
Derek Malcolm, film critic for The Evening Standard commented on it as "A moving film about parentage with an exceptional performance from Colin Holt at its centre".

References

External links
 

2007 films
2000s road comedy-drama films
British road comedy-drama films
Films shot in Cornwall
Films set in Cornwall
2000s English-language films
2000s British films